John Joseph Williams was an American bishop of the Roman Catholic Church. He was the fourth Bishop and first Archbishop of the Archdiocese of Boston, serving between 1866 and his death in 1907.

Early life and education
Williams was born in Boston, Massachusetts, to Michael and Ann (née Egan) Williams, who were Irish immigrants. His father was a blacksmith from Tipperary who came to the United States in 1818. He was raised in a house on Broad Street, and as a child, attended a primary school on Hamilton Street conducted by a Mrs. Newmarch. At the age of five, he became a pupil at the cathedral parochial school. Following the death of his father in 1830, his mother remarried and the family moved to the North End. 

After displaying an interest in the priesthood, Williams was sent by Bishop Benedict Joseph Fenwick to study at the Sulpician College in Montreal in 1833. He graduated from there in 1841, and then made his theological studies at the Seminary of Saint-Sulpice in Paris.

Priesthood
While in Paris, Williams was ordained a priest on May 17, 1845, by Denis Auguste Affre, the Archbishop of Paris who was later killed during the French Revolution of 1848. He returned to Boston in October 1845, and was then assigned as a curate at the Cathedral of the Holy Cross. He served in this capacity for ten years, also teaching Sunday school and catechism classes. He was rector of the cathedral from 1855 until 1857, when he became pastor of St. James Church in the same city, where in 1842 he established the first Conference of the Society of St. Vincent de Paul in New England. Under his charge, St. James saw much of its debt relieved and became one of the most important parishes in Boston.

In addition to his pastoral duties at St. James, Williams was named Vicar General of the Diocese of Boston in the summer of 1857. He administered the affairs of the diocese during the final years of Bishop John Bernard Fitzpatrick, whose health was in decline.

Episcopacy
On January 9, 1866, Williams was appointed coadjutor bishop of Boston and titular bishop of Tripolis by Pope Pius IX. However, before arrangements were completed for his episcopal consecration, Bishop Fitzpatrick died and Williams automatically succeeded him as the fourth Bishop of Boston on February 13, 1866. He was consecrated by Archbishop John McCloskey of New York, with bishops John J. Conroy and John Loughlin serving as co-consecrators, on the following March 11.

When the Diocese of Boston was elevated to the rank of an archdiocese on February 12, 1875, Williams became its first Archbishop. Ground was broken for the new, larger Cathedral on April 29, 1866.  The rites of dedication were performed in December 1875 by Archbishop Williams. His Jubilee celebration was sung by The Sanctuary Choir of the Cathedral in Boston on May 17, 1895 and the book containing the music sung was published by G. De La Motte that year. The Mass was sung in Latin.

References

 

1822 births
1907 deaths
American Roman Catholic clergy of Irish descent
Roman Catholic bishops of Boston
Roman Catholic archbishops of Boston
19th-century Roman Catholic archbishops in the United States
20th-century Roman Catholic archbishops in the United States
Burials at the Cathedral of the Holy Cross (Boston)